William T Randolph  (1713 or 1714-1745) was the son of Thomas Randolph of Tuckahoe in Goochland County, Virginia. He built the elegant two-story residence for Tuckahoe. Randolph held the positions of Clerk and Justice in Goochland County and he represented the county as a member of the House of Burgesses. He was the first Clerk of Albemarle County.

He was a good friend of Peter Jefferson, whose wife Jane Randolph Jefferson was Randolph's first cousin. The Jeffersons raised Randolph's children after his wife's death in 1743 and his death in 1745.

Early life
William was born in 1712 or 1713. Named after his grandfather William Randolph of Turkey Island, he was the son of Thomas Randolph and Judith Fleming Randolph. who was the daughter of Susanna Tarleton and Charles Fleming of New Kent County. William had two sisters, Maria Judith and Mary Isham.

Thomas founded Tuckahoe after he purchased land on September 4, 1714 from his brother John. The first church in the area Dover Church was built by his father in 1720 in exchange for 54,990 pounds of tobacco. Until 1728, the area was mostly wilderness with just a few homesteads. Thomas died in 1730. Judith married Nicolas Davies, an immigrant from Wales, on December 24, 1733.

Career

Plantation manager and owner

William Byrd of Westover visited Judith and questioned the difficulties the eighteen-year-old might face for taking on significant responsibilities before getting a good education. In any event, Randolph became an able manager of the family's plantation and fit in well with the "elite planter culture". Household and farm work was performed by indentured servants and enslaved men, women, and children. The slave quarters at Tuckahoe were larger than most slave quarters, which could be as small as 12 by 8 feet. They were about 16 by 20 feet, but were divided into two units, which were separated by a central chimney. Each room had an exterior door.

Tuckahoe, located along the James River in Goochland County, Virginia, was near the properties of his uncle, Isham Randolph of Dungeness, and Peter and Jane Jefferson. He patented 2400 acres in what is now Albemarle County. The land was adjacent to a 2000-acre tract owned by Peter Jefferson. Randolph sold 200 acres that were adjacent to Peter Jefferson's Shadwell property in 1741 to Jefferson, who used it for the site of his home with his wife Jane.

Politics
He worked for Goochland County as the Clerk and a Justice. In 1744, he became the first Clerk of Albemarle County, newly formed from part of Goochland County. He was elected to the House of Burgesses representing Goochland County in 1742; he died before the February 20, 1746 session.

Marriage and children

In 1733, Randolph started building a two-story house on Tuckahoe.
In 1735, he married Maria Judith Page, the daughter of Hon. Mann Page and Judith Wormsley or Wormeley of Rosewell. Known as Mary, she had a dowry of £2000 sterling, which the couple used to finish building the mansion for Tuckahoe. It was completed in 1840 and The Washington Post said that it is "one of the James River's most famous plantations.

They had four children, including their only son Thomas Mann Randolph Sr.

Death
Randolph was widowed when Maria died by 1742. He wrote out a will in late 1745, knowing that his three children would become orphans on his death.

William Randolph died in 1745. Although Peter Jefferson had intended to establish a plantation off the Rivanna River, he instead moved his family to Tuckahoe in 1746 and raised William and Maria Judith's children there until 1752, when Thomas Randolph was 21 years of age.

 During that time Jefferson managed the plantation, was executor of William Randolph’s estate, and was guardian of the children. It was considered unusual that he did not chose a Randolph family member to be guardian of his children or executor of his estate.

See also
First Families of Virginia
Randolph family of Virginia

Notes

References

1712 births
1746 deaths
American slave owners
People from Goochland County, Virginia
Randolph family of Virginia
Thomas Jefferson